Princesa may refer to:

 Spanish ship Princesa, various Spanish Navy ships
 Princesa Oliveros (born 1975), Colombian track and field hurdler
 Princesa, Santa Catarina, a municipality of Brazil
 Princesa (film), a 2001 film directed by Henrique Goldman
 Princess/Princesa, an EP by MC Magic
 "Prinçesa", a 1996 song from the album Anime salve by Fabrizio De André
 "Princesa", a 1998 song from the album No Me Compares by Franke Negrón
 "Princesa", a 2003 song from the album Belinda by Belinda Peregrín
 "Princesa", a 2006 song by Frank Reyes
 "Princesa", a 2018 song by Martina Stoessel and Karol G

See also 
 Puerto Princesa City, capital of Palawan, a first-class city in the Philippines
 Princesas, a 2005 film
 Princess (disambiguation)